Veneneia  is the second-largest crater on asteroid 4 Vesta, at 52°S latitude.  in diameter, it is 70% of the equatorial diameter of the asteroid, and one of the largest craters in the Solar System. It is at least 2 billion years old, and possibly as old as 4.2 billion years. However, it is overlain and partially obliterated by the even larger Rheasilvia. It was discovered by the Dawn spacecraft in 2011. It is named after Venēneia, one of the founding vestal virgins.

Vesta has a series of troughs in the northern hemisphere concentric to Veneneia. These are believed to be large-scale fractures resulting from the impact. The largest is Saturnalia Fossa, approx. 39 km wide and > 400 km long.

References

Impact craters on asteroids
Surface features of 4 Vesta